Andrey Shilin (born May 18, 1974) is an Uzbekistani sprint canoer who competed in the mid-1990s. He was eliminated in the semifinals of the K-4 1000 m event at the 1996 Summer Olympics in Atlanta.

External links
Sports-Reference.com profile

1974 births
Canoeists at the 1996 Summer Olympics
Living people
Olympic canoeists of Uzbekistan
Uzbekistani male canoeists
Asian Games medalists in canoeing
Canoeists at the 1998 Asian Games
Asian Games gold medalists for Uzbekistan
Asian Games bronze medalists for Uzbekistan
Medalists at the 1998 Asian Games
20th-century Uzbekistani people